Oldendorf can refer to several places in Germany:

in Lower Saxony:
Oldendorf (Celle district), a village in the district of Celle, part of the municipality Hermannsburg
Oldendorf, Stade, a municipality in the district of Stade
Oldendorf (Samtgemeinde), a collective municipality in Stade
Oldendorf (Luhe), part of the Samtgemeinde Amelinghausen in the district of Lüneburg
Hessisch Oldendorf, a town in the district Hamelin-Pyrmont
Stadtoldendorf, a town and a Samtgemeinde in the district of Holzminden
Oldendorf, Melle, a municipality in the district of Osnabrück
in North Rhine-Westphalia:
Preußisch Oldendorf, a town in the district Minden-Lübbecke
in Schleswig-Holstein:
Oldendorf, Schleswig-Holstein, part of the Amt Itzehoe-Land in the district Steinburg

Oldendorf can also refer to:
William H. Oldendorf, American neurologist and pioneer in neuroimaging
Jesse B. Oldendorf, US Navy task force commander in the 7th Fleet, during World War II